is a Japanese manga series created by Makoto Kobayashi and Olympic gold medalist judoka Yuko Emoto. It was serialized in Kodansha's seinen manga magazine Evening from August 2016 until February 2023, when the magazine ceased its publication; it is set to continue on the Comic Days app.

Publication
Written by Yuko Emoto, 1996 Atlanta Olympic Women's Judo-61 kg gold medalist, with Makoto Kobayashi in charge of dramatization, composition, and illustration, JJM: Joshi Judou-bu Monogatari started in Kodansha's Evening on August 9, 2016. It was originally conceptualized as a "what if" story depicting what would happen if the protagonist of Kobayashi's Judo-bu Monogatari was a woman. Evening ceased its publication on February 28, 2023, and the series is set to continue on Kodansha's Comic Days app. Kodansha has collected its chapters into individual tankōbon volumes. The first volume was released on December 22, 2016. As of November 22, 2022, 14 volumes have been released.

Volume list

Reception
By December 2020, the manga had over 1 million copies in circulation.

References

Further reading

External links
  

Judo in anime and manga
Kodansha manga
Seinen manga